Thomas Charles Baring DL (16 May 1831 – 2 April 1891) was a British banker and Conservative Party politician.

Life
Baring, informally called "T.C." or "Charley" to distinguish him from the other Thomases, was the son of the Right Reverend Charles Baring, Bishop of Durham, younger son of Sir Thomas Baring, 2nd Baronet. His mother was Mary Ursula, daughter of Charles Sealy. He was educated at Harrow and Wadham College, Oxford, before becoming a partner in the family firm of Baring Brothers & Co. In 1874 Baring gave £30,000 to enable Magdalen Hall in Oxford to be refounded as Hertford College, Oxford by means of an act of parliament. He entered Parliament for Essex South in 1874, a seat he held until 1885, and later represented the City of London from 1887 to 1891. Baring also served as a Justice of the Peace for Essex, Middlesex, London and Westminster, was a member of the Royal Commission on Loss of Life at Sea from 1885 to 1887, and the author of among other works Pindar in English Rhyme and The Scheme of Epicurus: A Rendering into English Verse of the Unfinished Poem of Lucretius Entitled, De Rerum Natura. With Barings facing bankruptcy following the Panic of 1890, he returned to business life to help reorganize the partnership as a limited liability company, and served as one of its Managing Directors until his death.

Baring married Susan, daughter of Robert Bowne Minturn, of New York City, in 1859. They had four sons and three daughters (of whom two sons never reached adulthood). He died in April 1891, aged 59. His wife survived him by six years and died in January 1897.

See also
Baron Northbrook

Notes

References

The New York Times obituary 3 April 1891
 Ziegler, Philip. The Sixth Great Power: A History of One of the Greatest of All Banking Families, the House of Barings, 1762-1929. Illustrated. 430 pp. New York: Alfred A. Knopf.

External links 

 
 Additional information from the Baring archive

1831 births
1891 deaths
Alumni of Wadham College, Oxford
Thomas
British bankers
Deputy Lieutenants of Essex
English translators
Members of Parliament of the United Kingdom for the City of London
Members of the Parliament of the United Kingdom for English constituencies
People educated at Harrow School
UK MPs 1874–1880
UK MPs 1880–1885
UK MPs 1886–1892
19th-century British translators
19th-century British businesspeople
People associated with Hertford College, Oxford